Vibhavariben Vijaybhai Dave is an Indian politician. She is a member of Legislative assembly from Bhavnagar (North) constituency  for its 12th legislative assembly and Bhavnagar East in 13th and 14th assembly.

References

Living people
Gujarat MLAs 2007–2012
Women in Gujarat politics
People from Bhavnagar
Gujarat MLAs 2012–2017
21st-century Indian women politicians
21st-century Indian politicians
Bharatiya Janata Party politicians from Gujarat
Gujarat MLAs 2017–2022
Year of birth missing (living people)